"I’ll Show You" is a single by Belarusian-Norwegian artist Alexander Rybak and Romanian musician Paula Seling. The song was released in Norway on 6 August 2012 as a digital download on iTunes.

Composition
The song is written in the key of D minor. The verses follow the chord progression of Dm–Gm–C–F–Bb–Gm–Eb–A. The verses use circle of fifths, alongside a Neapolitan chord (Eb).

Live performances
On 30 May 2012 Alexander Rybak & Paula Seling performed the song live on Romanian TV show Danutz srl, and Antena 1.

Track listing

Release history

References

Alexander Rybak songs
2012 singles
Eurodance songs
Synth-pop ballads
2010s ballads
2012 songs
Songs written by Alexander Rybak